This is a list of national population and housing censuses.

Census advisory 
The United Nations recommends a census enumeration at least once every ten years, and once every five years for even better data, rather than simply relying on estimates and projections alone.  Complications to carrying out a census include tribal conflict, war, borders not demarcated, budget, inexperience, political snags, lack of manpower, and poor geographic information systems.  A number of nations have not carried them out once a decade. It is not uncommon for a scheduled census to be deferred or delayed.

Lebanon has not held a census since 1932.  Afghanistan is closing in on four decades without a census. DRC and Uzbekistan stand out as not having a census since before 1990.  Madagascar has not had counts since the 1990s.  Eritrea has only had one as a part of Ethiopia in the 1990s.

Methods of conducting population census
More countries are switching to using administrative data to hold a census. This allows a simulated census to be conducted by linking several different administrative databases at an agreed time.

Americas

South America

Argentina 

National population censuses are carried out in Argentina roughly every ten years, the last ones having been carried out in 2001, October 27, 2010 and May 18, 2022.

Bolivia 

Population and housing censuses have been carried out in 1831, 1835, 1845, 1854, 1882, 1900, 1950, 1976, 1992, 2001 and 2012.

Brazil 
The Brazilian census is carried out by the Brazilian Institute of Geography and Statistics every 10 years. The last one was in 2010. Earlier censuses were taken in 1872 (the first), 1900, 1920, 1941, 1950, 1960, 1970, 1980, 1991, 2000 and 2010.

Brazil's Demographic Census is one of the most hierarchical collection of census data in the world. Its hierarchies include: Brazil (Country), Major Regions, States, Macro-regions, micro-regions, municipalities, districts, sub-districts, Neighborhoods and census tracts.

Depending on the administrative hierarchy, some types of data are not published to respect confidentiality.

For example:
The lower area of data collection is the census tract, with approximately 300 households, and information is collected on age, condition of the home, gender, income, among others.
Districts: information on race, color, religion, disability, etc.
Municipalities (cities): in addition to the information already described, there is information of GDP, industrial production, agricultural production, migration between cities to study or work, to live migration, inflation, employment rates, number of industries, the quantity of trade, etc.
Information is collected with handheld computers equipped with GPS receivers and digitized maps.

Next census was scheduled to begin August 1, 2020 but was delayed two times due to the ongoing COVID-19 pandemic. The Census is scheduled to begin on August 1, 2022. More than one million people applied for 206.891 positions.

Chile 
National population censuses are carried out in Chile every ten years by the National Statistics Institute (INE). The last one took place in 2012, but its results were dismissed by the INE due to a high omission rate and other problems. A new abbreviated census took place in April 2017, with a full census to be carried out in 2022. The last official census results are from 2002.

Colombia 
Population and Housing Censuses in Colombia were conducted by the National Administrative Department of Statistics in 1825, 1835, 1843, 1851, 1864, 1870, 1905, 1912, 1918, 1928, 1938, 1951, 1964, 1973, 1985, 1993, 2005 and 2018.

Ecuador 

The most recent censuses in Ecuador were in 2001 and 2010.

Peru 

The first census in Peru was carried out in 1836. The 12th and latest one was the 2017 Census and was carried out by Instituto Nacional de Estadística e Informática in October 2017.

Venezuela 
The study of the population in Venezuela is in charge of the National Institute of Statistics, which is in charge of collecting, analyzing and publishing data. Its best known publication is the Population Census, which is carried out in a period of no more than 15 years.

The last study of this type was carried out in 2011 between September and November.

Central America

Costa Rica 
Costa Rica carried out its tenth population census in 2011. INEC, National Institute of Statistics and Census is in charge of conduct these censuses. Past Costa Rican censuses were conducted in 1864, 1883, 1892, 1927, 1950, 1963, 1973, 1984, and 2000. The next census is scheduled for 2022.

Guatemala 
Modern population censuses have been taken in Guatemala in 1930, 1950, 1964, 1973, 1981, 1994, 2002 and 2018. Controversial censuses include those in 1950 and 1964 (misclassification of the Maya population) and 1994 (generally questioned). About 14,000,000 people live in Guatemala as of July 2009.

North America

Canada 

The Canadian census is run by Statistics Canada. The 1666 census of New France was conducted by French intendant Jean Talon, when he took a census to ascertain the number of people living in New France. The method and data was later used when Canada was founded 201 years later. The individual provinces (sometimes in conjunction with each other) conducted censuses in the 19th century and before. In 1871, Canada's first formal census was conducted, which counted the population of Nova Scotia, Ontario, New Brunswick, and Quebec.

Censuses in Canada are conducted in five-year intervals. The last census was conducted in 2016. Censuses taken in mid-decade (1976, 1986, 1996, etc.) are referred to as quinquennial censuses. Others are referred to as decennial censuses. The first quinquennial census was conducted in 1956.

For the 2006 Census of Canada, respondents were able to complete their census questionnaire online for the first time. Other options for answering the questionnaire included postal mail (using a pre-paid envelope) and telephone (using an 800 number).

At a sub-national level, two provinces (Alberta and Saskatchewan) and two territories (Nunavut and Yukon) have legislation that allows local governments to conduct their own municipal censuses.

United States 

The United States Constitution and federal law mandate that a census be taken every ten years in order to apportion the number of members of the United States House of Representatives among the several states. Census statistics are also used in order to apportion federal funding for many social and economic programs.

The first U.S. Census was conducted in 1790 by Federal Marshals. During the 19th century and through the 1940 census, enumeration was accomplished through political districts. Each ward was responsible for producing a census.

From 1950 onward, census forms were mailed to every address on record with the United States Post Office, including the Armed Services Postal System, in an effort to enhance completeness of the data collected. Beginning in 1970, it was made illegal to fail to return a completed census form. Computer technology was also introduced.

The 2010 census counted over 308 million people.

By law (92 Stat. 915, Public Law 95-416, enacted on October 5, 1978), individual census records are sealed for 72 years. The individual census data most recently released to the public was the 1940 census, released on April 2, 2012. Aggregate census data are released when available.

In addition to the decennial federal census, local censuses have also been conducted, for example, in Massachusetts, which conducted a statewide census every five years until 1985. Some states conducted limited censuses for various purposes, and these are typically located in state archives.

Next census was scheduled to begin 1 April 2020 but delays due to the ongoing COVID-19 pandemic meant most areas did not assign enumerators and begin counting until after August 1, 2020, even while their questions are still written to tabulate information about a housing unit's status on the prior date.

The 2020 census counted for over 331 million people.

Mexico 

 National population censuses have been carried out in 1910, 1921, 1930, 1940, 1950, 1960, 1970, 1980, 1990, 1995, 2000, 2005 and 2010.
 National economic censuses have been carried out in 1989, 1994, 1999, 2004, 2009 and 2014.

Caribbean

Antigua and Barbuda
Population & Housing Censuses was carried out in 1991, 2001, and 2011. The 2011 census  was released in May 2014.

Barbados 
Censuses on population sizes in Barbados are conducted by the Barbados Statistical Service (BSS). The last major census was conducted in 2010.

Curaçao 

General censuses of population and housing have been carried out in 1960, 1971, 1981, 1992, 2001, and 2011. In 2021 a new census will be conducted by the Central Bureau of Statistics of Curacao. For more information and the results of the older censuses visit the DIgitallibrary of CBS

Haiti 
General censuses of population and housing (French: Recensement Général de la Population et de l'Habitat (RGPH)) have been carried out in 1950, 1971, 1982, 2003 and 2014. First results of the 2014 census will be published between November and December 2014; final results will be published in November 2015.

Africa

Algeria

Population and housing censuses have been carried out in Algeria in 1967, 1977, 1987, 1998, and 2008. The next census was held in 2018.

Angola

General censuses of population and housing (Portuguese: Recenseamento Geral da População e Habitação (RGPH)) have been carried out in 1970 and 2014. The 1970 census counted 5,646,166 habitants. Preliminary results of the 2014 census have been published and final results will be published by the end of 2015. The 2014 census counted 25,789,024 habitants as of May 16, 2014.

Benin
Population and housing censuses have been carried out in 1978, 1992, 2002 and 2013. 2013 census preliminary results have been published.  Final results were published in 2015.

Botswana

Censuses in Botswana are run by the Statistics Botswana (formerly Central Statistics Office). There have been twelve censuses in Botswana's history. The most recent was the 2011 Botswana Population and Housing Census, which occurred in August 2011.

Burkina Faso
The Institut National de la Statistique et de la Demographie has conducted four censuses: in 1975, 1985, 1996, and 2006.

Congo (DRC)
The first and so far only census conducted in DR Congo dates from 1984.

Egypt

The Statistical Department of the Ministry of Finance conducted the first census in 1882, which considered as a preparatory step; the first true population census was conducted in 1897. Thereafter, censuses were conducted at ten-year intervals in 1907, 1917, 1927 and so on. The last one being in 2017.

Ethiopia
Three censuses have been taken in Ethiopia: 1984, 1994 and in 2007. The responsible institution is the Central Statistical Agency. Most of the census in 2007 was taken in August, while the Somali Region and the Afar Region were not covered. The northern Afar region is a remote, hot and arid area. The eastern Somali region (Ogaden) hosts a large nomadic Somali population and is a conflict area where Ethiopian regular forces are fighting against Ogaden National Liberation Front (ONLF).

Ivory Coast
Four general censuses of population and housing (French: Recensement Général de la Population et de l'Habitat (RGPH)) have been carried out in, the latest ones being in 1998 and 2014.

Kenya
The first census in Kenya was conducted in 1948, when Kenya was still a colony administered by the British. Since 1969 census has been taken every ten years. The last census, overseen by the Kenya National Bureau of Statistics, was in 2019 and recorded a population of 47.6 million.

Mauritius
Population and housing censuses for Mauritius was collected in 1972, 1983, 2000, and 2011; although respondents were asked to identify their race/ethnic origin in the 1972 census, this question was dropped from the following censuses because "the government felt that it was a divisive question". The Statistics Act directed that all official censuses be conducted by Statistics Mauritius, as well as serve as the central depository for this information.

Morocco

General censuses of population and housing (Arabic: الإحصاء العام للسكان والسكنى / French: Recensement Général de la Population et de l'Habitat (RGPH)) have been carried out since independence in 1960, 1971, 1982, 1994, 2004 and 2014. The 2014 census results will be published on http://rgph-2014.hcp.ma/ by the end of 2014.

Mozambique
The first census was taken in 1980. The second in 1997. The third was taken August 1–14, 2007. The fourth and most recent was taken in 2017.

Namibia
In accordance with the Statistics Act No. 66 of 1976, Namibia conducts a Population and Housing Census every ten years. After independence the first one was carried out in 1991, further rounds followed in 2001 and 2011. In Namibia, the de facto method is used. For enumeration purposes the country is demarcated into 4,042 enumeration areas. These areas do not overlap with constituency boundaries in order to get reliable data for election purposes as well.

Nigeria
Population censuses have been taken in Nigeria during colonial time in 1866, 1871, 1896, 1901, 1911, 1921 and 1952. The censuses covered only the southern part of the country except for the 1952 census which was country wide, and the censuses before 1921 were based on administrative estimates rather than on an actual enumeration.

Censuses during independence were taken 1962, 1963, 1973, 1991 and 2006. The results of the 1962 census were considered inaccurate enough that a new census was ordered on February 19, 1963. The results from 1973 and 2006 were highly disputed, but no recounts were taken. The preliminary results for 2006 indicates a population of 140 million people. 700,000 enumerators were engaged in this operation.

Somalia
There has been only one successful census in Somalia, carried out in 1975. The 1986 census remained incomplete, and its results were never published.

South Africa
The first census of South Africa was taken in 1911. Several enumerations have occurred since then, with the most recent three being carried out by Statistics South Africa in 1996, 2001 and 2011.

Sudan
Population censuses have been carried out in Sudan in 1955/56, 1973 (national), 1983 (national) and 1993 (only north). A census was conducted in April 2008. Some areas—namely Darfur, Juba, and Malakal—were difficult to measure.

Togo
General population and housing censuses were carried out in 1960, 1970, 1981 and 2010.

Tunisia
General censuses of population and housing (French: Recensement Général de la Population et de l'Habitat (RGPH)) have been carried out in 1921, 1926, 1931, 1936, 1946, 1956, 1966, 1975, 1984, 1994, 2004 and 2014. First results (20%) were published on September 12, 2014, the final results will be published between January and December 2015.

Uganda
The first censuses in Uganda were taken in 1911, 1921 and 1931. It was done in a rather primitive way. The enumeration unit was 'huts' and not individuals. More scientific censuses were taken 1948 and 1959 where the enumeration unit was persons. The census was however divided into two separate enumerations, one for Africans, and one for the non-African population.

The censuses during independence 1969, 1980, 1991 were taken jointly for all races. The censuses 1980 and 1991 included housing information and in addition a larger questionnaire for a sample of the population. However, the questionnaires for the 1980 were lost and only provisional figures are available from this census.

The census in 2002 involved some 50,000 enumerators and supervisors. It covered several topics including: population and housing; agriculture; and Micro- and small Enterprises administered at individual/household level. The Preliminary Results were published two weeks after the enumeration. The Final Results were released in March 2005, while the analytical findings and the district level results were scheduled to be released in the second quarter of 2006.

The most recent census was in August 2014.

Asia

Afghanistan
A partial and incomplete population census was taken in Afghanistan in June 1979.  Wars since then have caused significant population displacement and there has not been an updated count nor does the nation seem to have the technical ability nor will to tackle a modern census.

Azerbaijan

Population censuses have been taken in Azerbaijan under Russian/Soviet rule in 1897, 1926, 1937, 1939, 1959, 1970, 1979, and 1989. Beginning in 1991, two more census have been carried out in Azerbaijan: one in 1999 and one in 2009.

Bangladesh
Population censuses were conducted by the Bangladesh Bureau of Statistics (BBS) in 1974, 1981, 1991, 2001, 2011 and 2022.The 2022 Census was nation's first digital census.

China

China's first censuses were irregular: the Republic of China held censuses in 1913 and 1944. Under Mao Zedong, the People's Republic of China held its first in 1952, but the second in 1963 was secret and unacknowledged until the early 1980s.

The 1982 Chinese census was much more thorough and well-conducted than the first two, and similar censuses have been conducted decennially in 1990, 2000, and 2010. These are the world's biggest censuses and over 6 million enumerators were engaged in the 2000 and 2010 censuses.

Between the national censuses, 1% National Population Sample Surveys were taken in 1987, 1995, and 2005; 0.1% National Population Sample Surveys have been taken annually since 2000. National agricultural, economic, and industrial censuses are also taken on a regular basis. The first economic census was taken in 2004 and the second 2008.

Hong Kong

Census takes place every 10 years and by-census between two censuses by the Census and Statistics Department of Hong Kong. The last census was conducted March 2011.

India

The decennial census of India is the primary source of information about the demographic characteristics of the population of India. The 2011 census is one of the largest censuses in the history of mankind.

The first census in India in modern times was conducted in 1873. First regular census was started in 1881 by Lord Ripon. Since then, a population census has been carried out every 10 years. The latest census commenced on May 1, 2010. It will create a National Population Register with photographs and fingerprints of every resident. All usual residents of India will also be provided with their Unique ID numbers and National Identity Cards.
The census is carried out by the office of the Registrar General and Census Commissioner of India, Delhi, an office in the Ministry of Home Affairs, Government of India, under the 1948 Census of India Act. The act gives Central Government many powers like to notify a date for Census, power to ask for the services of any citizen for census work. The law makes it compulsory for every citizen to answer the census questions truthfully. The Act provides penalties for giving false answers or not giving answers at all to the census questionnaire. One of the most important provisions of law is the guarantee for the maintenance of secrecy of the information collected at the census of each individual. The census records are not open to inspection and also not admissible in evidence.

The census is conducted in two phases: first, house listing and house numbering phase and second, the actual population enumeration phase. The census is carried out by the canvassing method. In this method, each household is visited and the information is collected by specially trained enumerator. They collect data related to households e.g. number of members, water & electricity supply, ownership of land, vehicles, computers and other assets and services. In the second phase, total population is counted and statistics related to individuals are collected and saved into the governments hand.

Indonesia
The first population census was done during the colonial era, 1930. Before that, a non-overall census was already conducted in 1920. After that census was done irregularly. The first census after independence was 1961, followed by 1971. Since 1980 it is conducted regularly every 10 years. In between, there is also economical census (every 10 years, five years after population census) and agricultural census (three years after population census). The last census was held in September 2020 (2020 Indonesian census).

Iran

The Statistical Center of Iran carries out nationwide population and housing censuses every ten years, the first of which conducted in 1956 (1335 AP) reporting a total population of 19 million people. Since then, seven other censuses were conducted in 1966, 1976, 1986, 1996, 2006, 2011, 2016. As seen, the two censuses in 2006 and 2011 were conducted on a five-year basis, following a 2008 law. The law was rescinded in 2020, with the president announcing that the next census would be conducted in 2026, due to modernizing method to Register-based Census.

Iraq

The Central Statistical Organization - Ministry of Planning of Iraq is responsible for population and housing censuses.

According to the British government in Iraq, the population estimate in 1920 was 3 million. In 1927, the General Directorate of Population carried out the census, the population estimate was 2,968,054. Later, There were another 8 censuses in the years 1934, 1947, 1957, 1965, 1977, 1987 and the last one that was carried out in 1997.

After the War of Iraq, there was a plan for a new population and housing census. Data was collected and published in Central Statistical Organization website. Later, Data was updated, but no census was carried out due to country situation and dispute about census law.

Israel
The first census in the state of Israel was held in November 1948, six months after its creation, to establish the population registry. Subsequent censuses were conducted by the Israel Central Bureau of Statistics (ICBS) in 1961, 1972, 1983, 1995 and 2008. In these, 20% of households completed a detailed survey and the remainder a shorter questionnaire. There is no legal requirement to hold a census within a given interval; in practice, the ICBS requests and the government decides. The next census is scheduled for 2022.

Japan

Japan collects census information every five years. The exercise is conducted by the Statistics Bureau of the Ministry of Internal Affairs and Communications. October 1, 2010 and 2015 are Population Census Day.

The census questionnaires solicit information on name, gender, relationship to head of household, year and month of birth, marital status, nationality, number of the household members, type and nature of dwelling, floor area of the dwelling, number of hours worked during the week prior to October 1, employment status, name of employer and type of business, and kind of work.

Regardless of nationality or legal status, all residents in Japan are required to complete the census. All information collected by the census is confidential and protected by the Statistics Act. Information provided by census can never be used for any investigation purposes such as immigration control, police investigation, tax collections and so on. After the census, all forms are destroyed and recycled.

For the first time in 2010, residents of Tokyo were given an option to complete the census questionnaires online in lieu of the conventional paper questionnaires. Unique ID and password were provided with the census form. Tokyo was chosen as the initial rollout for the online questionnaires due to the high concentration of people living in apartment buildings or gated communities, which restricts the access of census workers. The online options were made available across Japan from the 2015 census.

The 2020 census was conducted in midst of global COVID-19 pandemic and the Japanese government urged the residents to respond the census online. Those who are unable to respond online may complete and mail back the paper questionnaires. The online census questionnaires are available in Japanese, English, Simplified Chinese, Traditional Chinese, Korean, Vietnamese, Spanish, and Portuguese. The paper census form is only written in Japanese, but translation is available in 29 different languages upon request.

Jordan
The first population census after the independence in 1946 was taken in 1952. It did only count the number of people in the households and could therefore be considered only to be a housing census. The first real complete census was taken in 1961. The following censuses have been taken in 1979, 1994 and 2004. The distribution of Palestinians and Jordanians within the population has been a politically sensitive issue since the Six-Day war in 1967.

Lebanon
No census has been conducted in Lebanon since 1932. It indicated a population of 861,399 Lebanese. Various estimates of the population have been taken since; in 1956 it was estimated a population of 1,411,416, with 54% Christian and 44% Muslim. Conducting a census since then has been complicated by various conflicts in the 1970s and 1980s, as well as by the sensitivity of religious issues.

Malaysia

The census in Malaysia is carried out every 10 years, like many nations, since 1960 (with the exception of the fourth census, which was carried out in 1991). The next census should be carried out in 2020. The most recent census was from July 6 to August 22, 2010.

Myanmar

A general census of population and housing has been carried out in 2014. Provisional results have been published and final results will be published in May 2015. The 2014 census counted 51,419,420 inhabitants.

Nepal

Census in Nepal are taken by Central Bureau of Statistics. Population censuses are conducted every tenth year in Nepal. The first was held in 1911 and the most recent was held in 2011.The census in 2021 is the first census of Federal Nepal.

Oman
Censuses have been taken in the Sultanate of Oman in 1993, 2003, and 2010.

Pakistan

Philippines

The census of the Philippines is enumerated every 5 years (beginning in 1960, except in 2005 where it was moved to 2007 due to budgetary constraints) and the results are used to allocate Congressional seats (congressional apportionment) and government program funding.

The census is performed by the Philippine Statistics Authority. The first official census in the Philippines was carried out by the Spanish government pursuant to a royal decree calling for the counting of persons living as of the midnight of December 31, 1877. The first door-to-door census was conducted in 1903 to fulfill Public Act 467 which was approved by the U.S. Congress in July 1902. The last national census was held in 2020. For years between the censuses, the NSO issues estimates made using surveys and statistical models.

Saudi Arabia
Population censuses have been taken in Saudi Arabia in 1962/63 (incomplete), 1974 (complete but not reliable), 1992, 2004 and 2010. An agriculture census was taken in 1999.

Singapore
Population censuses have been taken in Singapore every ten years, in 1970, 1980, 1990, 2000, 2010 and 2020

South Korea
South Korea had its first "modern" census in 1925.

The Census has been conducted 18 times every 5 years, Latest census was held in 2020.

Sri Lanka
The census in Sri Lanka is carried out by the Department of Census and Statistics every 10 years, with the next one being planned for 2011. The 2011 one being the first post-war census in three decades. The census will cover all Grama Niladhari (GN) divisions of the country. The first scientific census in Sri Lanka was conducted on March 27, 1871. The last four were in 1963, 1971, 1981 and 2001 with a census estimate in 1989. The 2001 census was only carried out in 18 Districts due to the Sri Lankan Civil War.

Syria
The first population census in Syria was taken by the French Mandatory Regime in 1921–22. This is however not considered reliable. Censuses during independence have been taken 1947, 1960 (the first comprehensive demographic investigation), 1970, 1976 (a sample census), 1981, 1994 and 2004 and the next would be taken at 2017.

Taiwan
The first census in Taiwan was conducted in 1905, while Taiwan was under Japanese rule.

Thailand
A census is conducted every 10 years, the latest being in 2010. The National Statistical Office of Thailand is in charge of conducting the census.

Turkey

The Turkish census is run by the Turkish Statistical Institute. The first census in Turkey was conducted in 1927. After 1935, it took place every 5 years until 1990. Now, the census takes place every 10 years. The last census was in 2000. It can be noted that the census enumeration takes place on one single day in Turkey (in other countries it takes 1–2 weeks). This required some 900,000 enumerators in 2000. The 15th census based on improved geographical information systems is planned for 2010.

A census was taken in the Ottoman Empire 1831–38 by Sultan Mahmud II (1808–1839) as a part of the reform movement Tanzimat. Christian and Jewish men were counted but the female population was excluded.

Uzbekistan
The last census in Uzbekistan was carried out in 1989 during Soviet rule.  Uzbekistan itself has never carried one out.

Europe

Albania

The latest population census was conducted in Albania on September 30, 2011.

The previous census was conducted in April 2001. Prior to that, a census was conducted in 1989 at the end of the Communist regime.

Austria
The Austrian census is run by Statistics Austria. It is carried out every ten years, the last one on October 31, 2011.

Belgium
The Belgium census is run by Statistics Belgium. The first census was carried out in 1846 then it is carried out every 10 years. The last census was taken in 2011. This is the first registered based census.

Bosnia and Herzegovina
Population censuses in Bosnia and Herzegovina were conducted in 1879, 1885, 1895, 1910, 1921, 1931, 1948, 1953, 1961, 1971, 1981 and 1991. The 2013 Census was organized in period between October 1–15, 2013. This is the first census after the end of the Bosnian War.

Bulgaria
Bulgarian governors organized a national census soon after the liberation of the Bulgarian lands. In 1881 a census took place in
the Principality, while in 1884 a census was organized in Eastern Rumelia. The first census covering the unified state took place in 1887.

Since these first accounts, Bulgarian authorities had organized several population censuses: 1892, 1900, 1905, 1910, 1920, 1926, 1934, 1946, 1956, 1965, 1975, 1985, 1992, 2001, and 2011.

The data provided in the Bulgarian censuses from 1888 until World War II is regarded as highly reliable according to the standards of the time. The Bulgarian leading statisticians of the period were generally educated in Western universities and participated vividly in the international cooperation, therefore insisted and succeeded in introducing the best practices of the time. The quality of the data provided of later censuses is a matter of debate. The religion question in the 2001 census didn't allow the unaffiliated Bulgarians to be counted as such.

Croatia
The census in Croatia is carried out every 10 years. The last census was taken in 2011 (from April 1 to 28). The first census was in 1857 when what is now Croatia was part of the Austrian Empire.

Cyprus

The British colonisers carried out seven censuses in Cyprus in total: six at ten-year intervals between 1881 and 1931, and the last in 1946. Following the establishment of the modern state, there have been seven more censuses: in 1960 (the year of establishment), 1973, 1976, 1982, 1992, 2001 and 2011. The Statistical Service of the Cypriot government counts from the first British census, i.e. the latest census, in 2011, is referred to as the 14th census. In Northern Cyprus there have been three censuses: in 1996, 2006 and 2011. All three have been a matter of controversy, both in the north and the south, and abroad.

Czech Republic
The census in the Czech Republic is carried out every 10 years by the Czech Statistical Office. The last census was taken in 2011. Earlier censuses were taken in 1869, 1880, 1890, 1900, 1910, 1921, 1930, 1950, 1961, 1970, 1980, 1991 and 2001.

The results of the last census are also available via the interactive model based software.

Denmark
The first Danish census was in 1700–1701, and contained statistical information about adult men. Only about half of it still exists. A census of school children was taken during the 1730s.

Following these early undertakings, the first census to attempt completely covering all citizens (including women and children who had previously been listed only as numbers) of Denmark-Norway was taken in 1769. At that point there were 797,584 citizens in the kingdom. Georg Christian Oeder took a statistical census in 1771 which covered Copenhagen, Sjælland, Møn, and Bornholm.

After that, censuses followed somewhat regularly in 1787, 1801, and 1834, and between 1840 and 1860, the censuses were taken every five years, and then every ten years until 1890. Special censuses for Copenhagen were taken in 1885 and 1895.

In the 20th century, censuses were taken every five years from 1901 to 1921, and then every ten years from 1930. The last traditional census was taken in 1970.

A limited population census based on registers was taken in 1976. From 1981 and each year onwards information that corresponds to a population and housing census is retrieved from registers. Denmark was the first country in the world to conduct these censuses from administrative registers. The most important registers are the Population Register (Det Centrale Personregister), the Building and Dwelling Register and the Enterprise Register. The central statistical office, Statistics Denmark is responsible for compiling these data. This information is available online in the Statbank Denmark.

It is possible to search a portion of the Danish censuses online at the Dansk Demografisk Database, and also view scanned versions at Arkivalier Online.

Estonia
Population censuses have been carried out in 1881, 1897, 1922, 1934, 1959, 1970, 1979, 1989, 2000 and 2011.

The censuses of 1881 and 1897 were carried out during the reign of the Russian Empire, when Estonia was divided between the Governorate of Estonia and the Governorate of Livonia. The latter also included territories of modern-day Latvia, however its Estonian-populated counties of Võru, Tartu, Viljandi, Pärnu and Saaremaa roughly corresponded to the later borders of the Republic of Estonia. Only later Estonian territories of Valga, Narva, Jaanilinn and Petseri County remained outside these figures.

The 1922 and 1934 censuses were carried out by the independent Republic of Estonia. The 1959, 1979 and 1989 censuses were carried out by the Estonian SSR of the Soviet Union and excluded Jaanilinn and Petseri County, which were annexed by the Russian SFSR in 1945. The 2000 and 2011 censuses were again carried out by the independent Republic of Estonia and also excluded the territories annexed by Russia in 1945. The current responsible institution is the Statistics Estonia.

Finland
The first population census was taken in 1749 when Finland was a part of Sweden. Although the parliament authorized a modern census in 1938, it was not undertaken until 1950. Finland has an accurate population registry system, thus censuses are in practice conducted by studying the registry, rather than as a separate project. Statistics Finland publishes various statistics on population: preliminary population statistics are published monthly, population structure report is published annually and population projections every three years. Once in ten years, the official locations and demarcations for densely populated areas (taajama) for traffic purposes, and official numbers of the speakers of national languages (Finnish or Swedish), for bilinguality, are reviewed.

France
The census in France is currently carried out by INSEE. The first census in France was conducted in 1801. Since 2004, a partial census has been carried out every year, and the results published as averages over 5 years.

Germany

The first systematic population on the European continent was taken in 1719 in Prussia (roughly corresponding to today's northern Germany and western Poland).

The first large-scale census in the German Empire took place in 1895. Attempts at introducing a census in West Germany sparked strong popular resentment in the 1980s since many quite personal questions were asked. Some campaigned for a boycott. In the end the Constitutional Court stopped the census in 1980 and 1983. The last census of West Germany was in 1987. Germany has since used population samples in combination with statistical methods, in place of a full census. But finally, on May 9, 2011, a new census of Germany was completed.

Greece

Census takes place every 10 years and is carried out by the National Statistical Service of Greece. The 2011 census ended on 24 May.

Hungary
Official decennial censuses have been taken in Hungary since 1870; the latest one – in line with the recommendations of the United Nations and the Statistical Office of the European Union – was carried out in 2011.
Starting from 1880 the Hungarian census system was based on native language (the language spoken at home in the early life of the person and at the time of the survey), vulgar language (the most frequently used language in the family), and other spoken languages.

Iceland
The first Icelandic census took place in 1703, following upon the first Danish census of 1700–1701. Further censuses were carried out in 1801, 1845 and 1865. The 1703 exercise was the first census ever to cover all inhabitants of an entire country, mentioning the name, age, and social position of each individual. All of the information still exists, although some of the original documents have been lost.

The need for censuses was eliminated through the setting up, in 1952, of the National Registry (Þjóðskrá), which later merged with other entities to form Registers Iceland. All those born in Iceland, and all new residents, are automatically registered. Individuals are identified in the registry by means of a national identification number (the so-called kennitala), a number composed of the date of birth in the format  and four additional digits, the third of which is a control digit, and the last of which indicates the century in which the person was born (9 for the 1900s and 0 for the 2000s).

The National Registry doubles as an electoral register. Likewise, all bank accounts are linked to the national identification of the owner (companies and institutions all have their own identification numbers).

Ireland

Population censuses covering all of Ireland were conducted every ten years from 1821 to 1911 inclusive. The first census following independence was conducted in 1926 and done every ten years until 1946. Since then, most censuses have been conducted every five years from 1951 to 2011 with two exceptions. Instead of censuses in 1976 and 2001, they were instead conducted in 1979 and 2002 respectively. The next census is scheduled for 2022, having been postponed from 2021 due to the COVID-19 pandemic. All original census returns from 1901 onwards survive, together with some 19th century fragments.

The census in Ireland is carried out by the Central Statistics Office. The census is taken every five years, with more detailed information collected in years ending in 1 and less in the years ending in 6. The 1976 census was cancelled as a cost-saving measure, but a supplementary census was held in 1979 after it became apparent that the 1970s had seen major demographic changes. The census scheduled for 2001 was postponed until 2002 due to the outbreak of foot-and-mouth disease.

Data from the 1901 Census of Ireland and the 1911 census of Ireland were first made publicly available in 1961. Subsequent census records will be made available 100 years after collection. The 1901 and 1911 census returns, together with the 19th century fragments, are freely available to view at the National Archives of Ireland website.

Italy
The census in Italy is carried out by ISTAT every 10 years. The last five were in 1971, 1981, 1991, 2001 and 2011.
From 2018, the census will be done every year, using a sample of population to correct databases that ISTAT create from registry offices and other public offices.

Kosovo

Kosovo, administered by the United Nations Interim Administration Mission in Kosovo since 1999, declared independence in 2008. Kosovo Statistical Agency organized the last census in 2011. The next one is foreseen for 2021. The first census was conducted in the Kingdom of Serbs, Croats and Slovenes in 1921.

Latvia
The most recent census in Latvia was in 2011. Before that, most censuses were conducted under Soviet control. The census is carried out by the Centrālā Statistikas Pārvalde (Central Statistical Bureau).

Netherlands
The first census in the Netherlands was conducted in 1795, and the last in 1971. A law was produced on April 22, 1879, ordering a census to be conducted every ten years.

The census that was planned for 1981 was postponed and later cancelled. A call for privacy was responsible for the cancellation of any further census since 1991. Censuses are being conducted by the Centraal Bureau voor de Statistiek since 1899. The censuses today are mostly (population, fiscal) register based, combined with surveying.

North Macedonia
The independence of the Republic of Macedonia followed the breakup of former Yugoslavia in 1991. The first population and housing census was conducted in the summer of 1994. The second census was conducted in the autumn of 2002. Both censuses were observed by international experts due to the sensitive issue regarding the ethnic distribution. The next census operation started in 2011 but it was aborted with the census declared unsuccessful. Following delay, a census was conducted in September 2021, which also included the diaspora.

Norway
The two first male censuses was conducted during the 1660s and 1701. Later statistical censuses were held in 1769, 1815, 1835, 1845, and 1855. Norway's first nominative, complete census was taken in 1801, when Norway still was ruled by the Oldenburg dynasty of Denmark-Norway. The scope of the census followed the de jure principle, so military persons should be included as well as foreigners if they were residents. The 1801, 1865, 1900 and 1910 censuses are transcribed and made searchable on the internet. The census records are made publicly available when 100 years have passed. Since 1900, a census has been conducted every ten years. (However, the 1940 census was postponed to 1946, and the census after 1990 came in 2001.) Since 2001 the population census has been combined with the housing statistics. The 2001 questionnaire only asked about households and who was living in them, while no questionnaires will be mailed out for the 2011 census, since the administrative data on households is sufficient.

Poland

The census in Poland is carried out by GUS approximately every 10 years. The 2002 census was conducted between 21 May and June 8. Poland's most recent census was held in 2011. The next census is scheduled for 2021.

Portugal
The first systematic census in Portugal was carried out on January 1, 1864. The census in Portugal is carried out by Instituto Nacional de Estatística (INE) every 10 years. The last census was taken on March 21, 2011.

Romania

The first census in Romania was carried out in 1859. It is now carried out every ten years by the Institutul Naţional de Statistică (INSSE). The last census was in 2011.

Russia and USSR

In Russia, the first census of the tax-payers was made in 1722–1723 by the order of Peter the Great (only men were counted), and was ordered to be repeated every twenty years. The only complete Russian Empire Census was carried out in 1897. All-Union Population Censuses were carried out in the USSR (which included RSFSR and the other republics) in 1920 (urban only), 1926, 1937, 1939, 1959, 1970, 1979, and 1989. The first post-Soviet Russian Census was carried out in 2002, followed by the 2010 Census. Currently, the census is the responsibility of the Federal State Statistics Service.

San Marino
Parish priests in San Marino maintained 'libri d'anime' or 'books of souls' as a population register between 1634 and 1860. The first general population census was conducted in 1865. Further censuses were held in 1874, 1899, 1947, and 1976. The Ufficio Informatica, Tecnologia, Dati e Statistica conducted the sixth population census on 7 November 2010.

Serbia

The census ordinarily takes place every 10 years. The last census was in 2011, the previous one was in 2002 (although having been planned for 2001) and the next is planned for 2021. The censuses before were organized in 1991, 1981, 1971, 1961, 1953 and 1948, during Communist Yugoslavia. During the Kingdom of Yugoslavia, censuses were conducted in 1931 and 1921; the census in 1941 was never conducted due to the outbreak of WWII.

The autonomous Principality of Serbia, had conducted the first population census in 1834; the subsequent censuses were conducted in 1841, 1843, 1846, 1850, 1854, 1859, 1863 and 1866 and 1874. During the era of the independent Kingdom of Serbia, six censuses were conducted starting on 1884 and the last one being in 1910. And then the frequent wars had prevented organizing any census prior to the Yugoslav one in 1921.

For the portions of Serbia ruled by Austria-Hungary until 1918, there were a total of five Austro-Hungarian censuses—1910, 1900, 1890, 1880 and 1869, immediately after the Dual Monarchy's constitution.

Slovakia
First modern census in the area of today's Slovakia was taken in 1869. Today, the census is conducted every 10 years by the Statistical Office of Slovak Republic. Last census was in May 2011.

Slovenia
The first census of modern Slovenia was carried in 1991, after independence had been declared. The Statistical Office of the Republic of Slovenia conducted the second census in 2002. Further censuses were carried out in 2011 and then every 10 years.

Spain

The census in Spain is carried out by INE every 10 years. Although there has been an old tradition and like for making census in Spain, the oldest ones dating back to the 12th century (by Alfonso VII of the Kingdom of Castile), the first modern census was carried out in 1768 by Conde de aranda, under the reign of Carlos III. The last five were in 1971, 1981, 1991, 2001, and 2011.

Sweden

The first population census in Sweden was carried out in 1749. The last population and housing census was carried out in 1990. It is planned to conduct population and housing censuses based on registers in the future.

Switzerland

In Switzerland, the Federal Population Census has been carried out every 10 years starting in 1850. The census was initiated by Federal Councillor Stefano Franscini, who evaluated the data of the first census all by himself after Parliament failed to provide the necessary funds. The census is now being conducted by the Swiss Federal Statistical Office.

Data collected include population data (citizenship, place of residence, place of birth, position in household, number of children, religion, languages, education, profession, place of work, etc.), household data (number of individuals living in the household, etc.), accommodation data (surface area, amount of rent paid, etc.) and building data (geocoordinates, time of construction, number of floors, etc.). Participation is compulsory and reached 99.87% of the population in 2000.

Since 2010, the population census has been carried out and analysed annually in a new format by the Federal Statistical Office (FSO). In order to ease the burden on the population, the information is primarily drawn from population registers and supplemented by sample surveys. Only a small proportion of the population (about 5%) is surveyed in writing or by telephone. The first reference day for the new census was December 31, 2010.

Ukraine

The first post-Soviet Ukrainian Census was carried out by State Statistics Committee of Ukraine in 2001, 12 years after the last All-Union census in 1989.

United Kingdom

In the seventh century, Dál Riata was the first territory in what is now the UK to conduct a census. The Domesday Book of 1086 in England contained listings of households but its coverage was not complete and its intent was not the same as modern censuses.

Following the influence of Malthus and concerns stemming from his An Essay on the Principle of Population the UK census as we know it today started in 1801. The census has been conducted every ten years since 1801.

The first four censuses (1801–1831) were mainly headcounts and contained little personal information. The 1841 Census, conducted by the General Register Office, was the first to record the names of everyone in a household or institution. From 1851 onwards the census shows the stated age and relationship to the head of household for each individual. Because of World War II, there was no census in 1941. The actual census dates were 6 June 1841, 30 March 1851, 7 April 1861, 2 April 1871, 3 April 1881, 5 April 1891, 31 March 1901, 27 March 1911.

The census of England & Wales is undertaken for the government by the Office for National Statistics (ONS). The General Register Office for Scotland (GROS) conducts its own census, while the census in Northern Ireland is carried out by the Northern Ireland Statistics and Research Agency (NISRA). Public access to the census returns is restricted under the terms of the 100-year rule. The most recent returns made available to researchers are those of the 1921 census.

The most recent UK census took place in England, Wales and Northern Ireland on 21 March 2021. Because of the COVID-19 pandemic the census in Scotland was delayed to 20 March 2022.

Oceania

Australia

The Australian census is operated by the Australian Bureau of Statistics. It is currently conducted every five years, the last occurrence being on August 10, 2021. Past Australian censuses were conducted in 1911, 1921, 1933, 1947, 1954, and every five years since 1961. In 2016, for the first time, Australians were able to complete their census online.

New Zealand

The census in New Zealand is carried out by Statistics New Zealand , usually every five years. The 1951 census was the first year in which Māori and European New Zealanders were treated equally, with European New Zealanders having had a different census form in previous years and separate censuses in the 19th century. Results for those censuses before 1966 have been destroyed with a few exceptions and those since will not be available before 2066.

For the 2001, 2006 and 2013 Censuses of New Zealand, respondents could choose to complete their census questionnaire online. The census was scheduled on 8 March 2011. However, it was cancelled due to the September 2010 and February 2011 Canterbury earthquake. The 1931 census was also cancelled due to the effects of the Great Depression, and was the 1941 census due to the Second World War.

A census was instead held on 5 March 2013. For the 2018 census, online participation was prioritised, with paper forms available upon request. The census was also scheduled on 7 March 2023.

See also
 List of national and international statistical services
 Demography
 IBM and the Holocaust, a book
 Intercensal estimate
Liber Censuum
 Official statistics
 Race and ethnicity in censuses
 Social research

References

External links
 Latest censuses by country (United Nations)